Arasawa Dam is a concrete gravity dam located in Yamagata Prefecture in Japan. The dam is used for flood control and power generation. The catchment area of the dam is 162 km2. The dam impounds about 189  ha of land when full and can store 41420 thousand cubic meters of water. The construction of the dam was started on 1949 and completed in 1955.

References

Dams in Yamagata Prefecture
1955 establishments in Japan